Mohammed Saeed Busanda Ahmed Al-Falahi (Arabic:محمد بو سنده) (born 20 June 1995) is an Emirati footballer. He currently plays for Al Ain. He has played AFC Champions League, Arabian Gulf League, League Cup, and Presidents Cup.

External links

References

Emirati footballers
1995 births
Living people
Al Ain FC players
UAE Pro League players
Association football goalkeepers